Unnatural Causes is a 1993 television film adaptation of the 1967 detective novel of the same name by P. D. James written by Peter Buckman. Differing in several details from the original plot, it stars Roy Marsden as Commander Adam Dalgliesh and is part of the Dalgleish series of television films.

References

External links
 

1993 television films
1993 films
Films directed by John Davies (director)
Films with screenplays by Peter Buckman
Films based on British novels